Kohver is an Estonian surname (meaning suitcase), and may refer to:

August Kohver (1889–1942), Estonian agronomist and politician
Eston Kohver (born 1971), Estonian security police officer

Estonian-language surnames